Detlef Heusinger (born 1956 in Frankfurt) is a German composer and conductor.

For 1996/97, he was awarded a scholarship at the Villa Massimo in Rome.

In 2009, Heusinger founded the soloist "Ensemble Experimental".

Work

Until 1990 
 Ent-Fremdung. For four guitars (1978/1995)
 Todesfuge. For baritone, guitar and string quartet (1979–1980)
 Aufstieg. For chamber ensemble (1982)
 Materialermüdung. Played on two pianos for four hands (1982)
 Spiel der Zeit. Three sonnets (Gryphius) with prelude, interlude and postlude for soprano, baritone and chamber orchestra (1983)
 Stückwerk. For guitar solo (1983/1987)
 Epiphora – Oxymora – Anaphora. Three pieces for piano (1984/1986)
 Rhap-Time. For 19 instruments (1985)
 Spuren-Eleente/Trace elements. For guitar (1985)
 Von Insel zu Insel. For chamber ensemble (1985–1986)
 Der Turm. Stage music for vocal soloists, dancers, orchestra and Live-electronic, after the play of the same name by Peter Weiss (1986/1988)
 Noema. For flute and guitar (1987/1989)
 Ellipsis. For small orchestra (1988)
 Rossini a.D. Musical posse for three singers, five dancers and chamber orchestra, libretto by Heusinger using texts by Gioachino Rossini (1989–1990)

1990 until 2000 
 Totem und Tabu. Ballet for soprano, six violoncellos and four drumers, after texts by Sappho (1991)
 Pandora I und II. For string quartet (1993–1994)
 Herzlieb I und II. Interludes on the Handel's opera Orlando for two sopranos and chamber orchestra (1994)
 Abraum. For piano trio and Live-Elektronik (1995)
 Babylon. Musiktheater in three acts for soloists Soli, large orchestra and tape. Libretto by Heusinger after Michel Ghelderode (1995–1996)
 Schwarz – Rot – Gold. A Rühr-Schauer play about the 1848 "German revolution" 1848 for singers, dancers, actors and chamber ensemble (1997–1998)
 terra incognita. For Grand orchestra (1997)
 Vorüber. For one singing voice with piano, free after text fragments from Goethe's Faust (1997)

2000 until 2010 
 Sintflut / The Flood. Videotryptichon for three orchestra groups and five-channel tape (2000–2001)
 Ballade cruelle. For guitar solo, after Francisco de Goya (2003)
 Sakura-Saku. For guitar solo (2003)
 Drei japanische Liebeslieder (Wakas). For high voice and guitar (2003–2004)
 Kagebayashi I, II, III. Three interludes from the geza-music cycle for chamber ensemble (2004)
 2nd anniversary of zabriskie point. Instrumental concert for electric guitar and Orchestra (2005)

2010 until 2020 
 Tripelkonzert. 1st part for oboe d'amore, viola, verstärktes Cembalo and large orchestra (2010)
 Abraum II. For piano trio and Live-Elektronik (2011–2012)
 Ballade sentimentale. For guitar (2012)
 Sintflut X. Video opera for videotryptichon and eight-channel feed (2012–2013)
 Abzweige. For ensemble and Live-Elektronik (2013–2014)
 Klavierwerk I. For piano (2015–2016)
 Ver-Blendung. For flute, accordion and electronics (2016)
 4 CROSSROADS. For guitar/electric guitar, violoncello/E-Bass, piano, drums, boy soprano and Elektronik (2017)

References

External links 
 
 
 Ensemble Experimental.
 Experimentalstudios des SWR.

German conductors (music)
20th-century German composers
1956 births
Living people
Musicians from Frankfurt